The 1963 winners of the Torneo di Viareggio (in English, the Viareggio Tournament, officially the Viareggio Cup World Football Tournament Coppa Carnevale), the annual youth football tournament held in Viareggio, Tuscany, are listed below.

Format
The 16 teams are organized in knockout rounds. The round of 16 are played in two-legs, while the rest of the rounds are single tie.

Participating teams

Italian teams

  Bologna
  Fiorentina
  Inter Milan
  Juventus
  Milan
  Modena
  Napoli
  Sampdoria

European teams

  Partizan Beograd
  Rijeka
  Daring
  Dukla Praha
  Grazer AK
  Bayern München
  Progresul București
  CSKA Sofia

Tournament fixtures

Champions

Footnotes

External links
 Official Site (Italian)
 Results on RSSSF.com

1963
1962–63 in Italian football
1962–63 in Yugoslav football
1962–63 in Romanian football
1962–63 in German football
1962–63 in Czechoslovak football
1962–63 in Bulgarian football
1962–63 in Belgian football
1962–63 in Austrian football